Jesus Backside Beach or Dolok Oan Beach is a public beach located in the suco of Hera, a short distance north east of Dili, East Timor. The beach forms part of the south shore of Wetar Strait, immediately to the east of Cape Fatucama.

Etymology
The beach's "precise but utterly uncharming" most commonly used English language name, Jesus Backside Beach, alludes to the colossal Cristo Rei of Dili statue located immediately to its west. As the statue faces in a westerly direction, it presents its rear or back side to the beach.

Geography

The beach faces Wetar Strait, which passes between the north eastern shore of Timor and the Indonesian island of Wetar to its north. On the beach's land side, it is surrounded by steep low hills overlaid with Eucalyptus alba savanna woodland, in which small stands of tropical dry forest are developing. The beach and woodland are both part of the Areia Branca no Dolok Oan Important Bird Area.

At the peak of Cape Fatucama is the Cristo Rei of Dili statue, which is accessible from the car park at nearby Cristo Rei Beach, just inside the Bay of Dili on the other side of the Cape, via a 570-step concrete staircase.

The beach is popular with both locals and tourists. Pedestrian access is provided by a combination of the main staircase to Cristo Rei of Dili and a second concrete staircase descending from about one third of the way up the main staircase. There is also vehicle access, via a rough road that enters the area from the east.

The waves at the beach are stronger than those at the more sheltered Cristo Rei Beach, and some parts of it are fringed by rocky reefs. Good snorkeling is available directly from the shore. Despite the barriers to access, the beach is popular with local residents and tourists on Sundays and holidays, and occasionally also attracts people on company sponsored outings or taking diving lessons.

Facilities
Other than the car park at Cristo Rei Beach, the staircases providing access for pedestrians, and the rough road that gives access to vehicles, the beach is an unspoiled coastline with no facilities. There are no shelters other than the trees, no toilets, no snack shops and no lifeguard station; nothing is available for rent, and there are no hawkers offering food or any other items.

Visitors to the beach have been observed responding to its lack of facilities by bringing their own equipment, such as beach mats and even whole dining sets including tables and chairs. Some of them also set up and use barbecue pits to cook their own food.

See also
 Areia Branca Beach
 One Dollar Beach
 Valu Beach

References

External links

Beaches of East Timor
Dili Municipality